The men's 4 × 100 metre medley relay event at the 2014 Commonwealth Games as part of the swimming programme took place on 29 July at the Tollcross International Swimming Centre in Glasgow, Scotland.

The medals were presented by David Leather, Chief Operations Officer of Glasgow 2014 and the quaichs were presented by Gordon Matheson, Leader of Glasgow City Council.

Records
Prior to this competition, the existing world and Commonwealth Games records were as follows.

The following records were established during the competition:

Results

Heats

Finals

References

External links

Men's 4 x 100 metre medley relay
Commonwealth Games